The National Assembly of the Republic of Kenya is one of the two Houses of the Parliament of Kenya. Between 1966 and 2013, it served as a unicameral house. In 2013 (11th Parliament), it became the lower house when the Senate was reestablished.

It has a total of 349 seats: 290 elected from the constituencies, 47 women elected from the counties and 12 nominated representatives. The Speaker of the National Assembly of Kenya serves as an ex officio member.

The High Court of Kenya ordered lawmakers to introduce gender quotas, or face dissolution in the mid-2010s, following the implementation of the 2010 Constitution.

Committees

House Keeping committees
 House Business Committee: creates Parliamentary calendar; schedules committee business; issues directives and guidelines to prioritise or postpone any business of the House.
 Procedure & House Rules Committee: proposes rules for the orderly and effective conduct of committee business.
 Liaison Committee: guides and co-ordinates the operations, policies and mandates of all committees.
 Committee on Selection: nominates members to serve in committees.
 Committee on Members Services & Facilities.

Investigatory Committees
 Public Accounts Committee: responsible for the examination of the accounts showing the appropriations of the sum voted by the House to meet the public expenditure and of such other accounts
 Public Investments Committee: examines the reports and accounts of public investments
Special Funds Accounts Committee: examines the reports and accounts of national Funds except the National Governments Constituency Development Fund (NGCDF)

Departmental committees:
 Defence and Foreign Relations Committee: Defence, intelligence, foreign relations diplomatic and consular services, international boundaries, international relations, agreements, treaties and conventions
 Administration and National Security Committee: National security, police services, home affairs, public administration, public service, prisons, immigration and the management of natural disasters, community service orders
 Agriculture & Livestock Committee: Agriculture, livestock, irrigation, fisheries development, co-operatives development, production and marketing
 Environment and Natural Resources Committee: Matters relating to climate change, environment management and conservation, forestry, water resource management, wildlife, mining and natural resources, pollution and waste management
 Education & Research Committee: Education, training, research and technological advancement
 Energy Committee: Fossil fuels exploration, Development, production, maintenance and regulation of energy, communication, information, broadcasting and Information Communications Technology (ICT) development and management
 Finance and Planning: Public finance, monetary policies, public debt, financial institutions, investment and divestiture policies, pricing policies, banking, insurance, population, revenue policies, planning, national development, trade, tourism promotion and management, commerce and industry
 Health Committee: Matters related to health, medical care and health insurance
 Justice and Legal Affairs Committee: Constitutional affairs, the administration of law and justice, including the Judiciary, public prosecutions, elections, ethics, integrity and anti-corruption and human rights
 Labour and Social Welfare Committee: Labour, trade union relations, manpower or human resource planning, gender, culture and social welfare, youth, National Youth Service children's welfare; national heritage, betting, lotteries and sports
 Lands Committee: Matters related to lands and settlement
 Transport, Public Works and Housing Committee: Transport, roads, public works, construction and maintenance of roads, rails and buildings, air, seaports and housing
 Trade, Industry and Cooperatives Committee
 Communication, Information and Innovation Committee

Other Select committees:
Budget and Appropriations Committee: investigates, inquires into and reports on all matters related to co-ordination, control and monitoring of the national budget; examines the Budget Policy Statement; examines bills related to the national budget, specifically the Appropriations Bill, the Supplementary Appropriation Bill, the Division of Revenue Bill and the County Allocation of Revenue Bill
 Committee on Implementation: responsible for scrutinising the resolutions of the House (including adopted committee reports), petitions and the undertakings given by the National Executive
 Committee on Delegated Legislation: delegates on statutory instruments submitted to the Assembly
 Committee on Regional Integration: examine the records of all the relevant debates and resolutions of the meetings of the East African Legislative Assembly; inquires into and examines any other matter relating to regional integration generally requiring action by the House
 Committee on Appointments: 
 National Government Constituency Development Fund Committee 
 Constitution Implementation Oversight Committee
 Pensions Committee
 Committee on National Cohesion and Equal Opportunity
 Parliamentary Broadcasting and Library Committee

Coalition and party summary 

See also, Kenya National Assembly elections, 2013. For a list of current members, see 12th Parliament of Kenya#Members

Prior to the 2013 elections, the Jubilee Alliance consisted of The National Alliance, United Republican Party, and the National Rainbow Coalition. After the results were announced, Jubilee made post-election agreements with the New Ford Kenya, Alliance Party of Kenya, Chama Cha Uzalendo, People's Democratic Party, Ford People, Kenya African National Union, and United Democratic Forum.
Reports indicate that two independents, NARC-Kenya, and one member of the Federal Party of Kenya also agreed to work with Jubilee.

(Members between 2013 and 2017)

See also

National Assembly of Kenya elections, 2007
Constitution of Kenya

General:

History of Kenya
List of national legislatures
Legislative branch

References

External links

Parliament of Kenya

 
Politics of Kenya
K
1963 establishments in Kenya